= Microfinance Insights =

- Managing Editor: Lindsay Clinton
- Categories: Business magazine
- Frequency: Quarterly
- Circulation: Worldwide
- Publisher: Intellecap
- Founded: 2006
- Final issue: 2009
- Company: Intellectual Capital Advisory Services Pvt. Ltd.
- Country: India
- Language: English
- Website: Official Microfinance Insights website

Microfinance Insights was an international print magazine that published quarterly. The magazine featured analysis and commentary on the microfinance sector, updates on the latest trends, and profiles of global sector players. Each issue focused on a theme from the microfinance sector.

== History and profile ==
The first issue of Microfinance Insights was released in October 2006.

Microfinance Insights was a publication of Intellecap, a social business advisory firm. The magazine ceased publication in 2009.

== See also ==
- Venture Capital
- Capital market
